Philippe Olivier (born 30 August 1961) is a French politician who was elected as a Member of the European Parliament in 2019.

Olivier stood at the 2017 French parliamentary election in Pas-de-Calais's 7th constituency. He was defeated by Republicans candidate, Pierre-Henri Dumont in the second round.

His wife, Marie-Caroline Le Pen, is the sister of French presidential candidate Marine Le Pen.

References

1961 births
Living people
MEPs for France 2019–2024
National Rally (France) MEPs
National Rally (France) politicians
20th-century French lawyers
Le Pen family
University of Paris alumni
French twins
Politicians from Île-de-France
People from Juvisy-sur-Orge